A Christmas Romance is a 1994 American made-for-television Christmas romantic drama film directed by Sheldon Larry and starring Olivia Newton-John, Gregory Harrison and Chloe Lattanzi, Newton-John's real-life daughter. It was written by Darrah Cloud based on the novel A Christmas Romance by Maggie Davis. The film was shot on location in Vancouver, British Columbia, Canada and originally premiered on CBS on December 18, 1994.

Newton-John also sings the song "The Way of Love" in the opening and closing credits, a track taken from her 1994 album Gaia: One Woman's Journey.

Summary
Julia Stonecypher (Olivia Newton-John) is a widow with two young daughters – Deenie and Emily Rose (Chloe Lattanzi and Stephanie Sawyer) – who struggles to keep up financially and loses her job just days before Christmas. To make matters worse, Brian Harding (Gregory Harrison), an upscale banker from the city, comes to visit Julia to tell her that her house is being repossessed and she will be homeless; Julia is unable to pay.

When Brian takes off into a snowstorm, his car slides into a ditch and he is injured. Julia allows him into her home to recuperate despite his surly attitude and the four of them are trapped together in the isolated house. But as they wait out the storm, Brian begins to have a change of heart and an unlikely romance flares up between him and Julia, fuelled by the atmosphere of Christmas time.

Cast
 Olivia Newton-John as Julia Stonecypher
 Gregory Harrison as Brian Harding
 Chloe Lattanzi as Deenie Stonecypher
 Stephanie Sawyer as Emily Rose Stonecypher
 Tom Heaton as Mel Betsill
 Stephen E. Miller as Bert Betsill
 Brent Stait as O.T. Betsill
 Susan Astley as Margie Peterson
 Tom McBeath as Mr. Macklin
 Anna Ferguson as Old Woman

Reception

Ratings
The film was watched by 25.5 million people and placed 6th for the week in total viewers.

DVD release
On September 13, 2011, A Christmas Romance was released on Region 1 DVD by Echo Bridge Home Entertainment.

References

External links
   
A Christmas Romance at olivia-newtonjohn.com

1994 television films
1994 romantic drama films
1994 films
American Christmas drama films
American romantic drama films
Christmas television films
CBS network films
Films based on American novels
Films shot in Vancouver
American drama television films
1990s English-language films
Films directed by Sheldon Larry
1990s American films